Wisin & Yandel Presentan: WY Records: Lo Mejor De La Compañía (English: Wisin & Yandel Present: WY Records: The Best of the Company) is a collaboration album by Wisin & Yandel featuring the artists from their record label WY Records.

Album details
It features the following artists: Wisin & Yandel, Gadiel, Franco "El Gorila", Tico "El Imigrante", and Jayko, with guest appearances by Cosculluela, Luis Fonsi, Tony Dize, Yaviah, and Nelly Furtado.

Track listing

References

Wisin & Yandel compilation albums
2010 compilation albums
WY Records compilation albums